Lebanon is a town in New London County, Connecticut, United States. The population was 7,142 at the 2020 census. The farming town is best known for its role in the American Revolution, where it was a major base of American operations, and for its historic town green, which is one of the largest in the nation and the only one still used partially for agriculture.

History

From Poquechaneed to Lebanon
Lebanon was originally settled by the Mohegan people, an Algonquian-speaking tribe that inhabited the upper Thames River Valley in eastern Connecticut. The area was known as Poquechaneed and was used primarily for hunting.

The town of Lebanon has its origins with the settlers of Norwich, who wanted to expand beyond the "nine miles square" they had bought from the Mohegan sachem Uncas. This area, known as "Pomakuck" or "Pomocook" by the Mohegans, is now the Goshen Hill area of Lebanon.

In 1666, Connecticut granted an additional  to the Rev. James Fitch, minister of Norwich, adjacent to Maj. Mason's land which was now known as Cedar Swamp. The Mohegans conferred their blessing on the grants by giving an additional  strip to Maj. Mason's son in 1675, who split the land with the Rev. Fitch, his father-in-law. This area is now known as "Fitch and Mason's Mile", or just "The Mile".

In 1692, Uncas' son, Sachem Owaneco, sold  to four men from Norwich and Stonington (including Sam Mason, another son of Maj. Mason), known as the "Five Mile Purchase" or "Five Mile Square" (being  on each side). With the Purchase, most of the modern-day town of Lebanon was established.

The town of Lebanon was incorporated by the General Assembly of the Connecticut Colony on October 10, 1700. The town's name was the idea of one of the Rev. Fitch's sons, because of "the height of the land, and a large cedar forest." Lebanon was the first town in the Connecticut Colony to be given a Biblical name.  Originally (and now) in New London County, it was part of Windham County from 1726 to 1824.

"Heartbeat of the Revolution"
Connecticut's war effort during the Revolutionary War was directed from the War Office on the Green and the adjacent home of Gov. Jonathan Trumbull Sr.

One of the signers of the Declaration of Independence, William Williams, was a native of Lebanon, and son-in-law to the governor, Jonathan Trumbull.

Jonathan Trumbull was the only British colonial governor to side with the rebel forces during the Revolution. Trumbull served as one of George Washington's chief quartermasters, convening a Council of Safety to manage the affairs of the Continental Army. The council met over 1,100 times, mostly in Trumbull's own house on the Lebanon Green. Trumbull was also paymaster general for the Northern Department of the Continental Army, and the first comptroller of the young nation's treasury during the war.

Trumbull's children were also influential in the war effort: Joseph Trumbull was a colonel in the Continental Army, Jonathan Trumbull Jr. was secretary to George Washington, and John Trumbull served first as a soldier and then as Washington's personal aide during the war.

In the winter and spring of 1781 (from November 1780 to June 21, 1781), the French duc de Lauzun's Legion of Horse, comprising 220 soldiers, encamped in Lebanon. Though the legion became infamous later for disorderliness, dueling, and pillaging, they were generally well behaved, and Lebanon saw only two officers executed by firing squad for attempted desertion. The local economy benefited from the troops' extended stay, but not significantly. In June, the soldiers rode off toward White Plains, New York. Lauzun remarked later in his memoirs, "Siberia alone can furnish any idea of Lebanon, which consists of a few huts scattered among vast forests."

The importance of the Trumbull family and of Lebanon itself to the war effort earned the town the nickname "Heartbeat of the Revolution."

Into the 19th and 20th centuries
Joseph Trumbull, father of Jonathan Trumbull Sr., brought livestock farming to the town in 1704, and by 1730 Lebanon had the largest meat packing industry in Connecticut. Agriculture has since been the primary focus of the town. Lebanon entered a period of gentle decline after the Revolution; with the death of Jonathan Trumbull Jr. in 1809, the Trumbull family left Lebanon, and the town's political significance fell.

Nonetheless, as the towns around it commercialized and modernized, Lebanon maintained its focus on agriculture, and remained a dedicated farming town. It was this characteristic that brought a major wave of immigration in the early 20th century. After the expulsion of pacifist Mennonites from the Ukraine in the mid-19th century, German farmers settled in the areas they had vacated. Political troubles in Russia and the onset of the First World War encouraged many of these to flee to America. Karlswalde, a village near Ostrog, saw its entire population leave. One emigrant, Philip Krause, settled in the Village Hill area of Lebanon. The town offered similar terrain and fertile farming ground, and by 1928, twelve families of Karlswalde had been moved to the Lebanon neighborhood. Many of these families are still present and active in Lebanon today, and exhibited a major influence on the town's culture.

The Liberty Hill neighborhood was the commercial center of town for most of the 19th century and into the 20th. Holding the town's post office, as well as two general stores, it was Lebanon's primary link to the larger Connecticut and New England communities. The area maintained its importance into the 1930s and 1940s. The greater availability of telephones in private residences, the improvement of roads and the introduction of highways, and the increase of personal cars for commuting to surrounding towns, all meant that individuals had less need to restrict themselves to close by conveniences. Liberty Hill nonetheless remains one of Lebanon's primary neighborhoods.

Lebanon saw no less than 10% of its residents leave to fight in the Second World War. The Memorial Day parade is still one of the town's largest annual celebrations.

Present
Economically, the town has large agricultural and service sectors, the largest employers being farms and the school system. KofKoff Egg Farms, Connecticut and New England's largest egg producer, maintains a farm in the town. The Lebanon Country Fair, seasonally the earliest fair held in Connecticut, is known for its agricultural shows. The Lebanon School District is responsible for the town's three schools, Lyman Memorial High School, Lebanon Middle School, and Lebanon Elementary School. The Lyman Memorial Girls softball team won the State Championship in 2007, while also the Volleyball Team won back to back state championships in 2019 and 2020/21. making it the only outright state championship in the school's history. The town itself is still centered around the Green which is the site of many of Lebanon's most prominent past citizens' homes, including Gov. Trumbull and William Beaumont. Three churches (First Congregational Church of Lebanon, Lebanon Baptist Church and Saint Francis of Assisi Roman Catholic Church) are also located on the Lebanon Green.  The Jonathan Trumbull Library, a popular meeting place, is also located on the Green, as are the War Office, the Jonathan Trumbull Jr. house, and the Wadsworth Stable. The Redeemer Lutheran Church is located at the "Village Hill" area of town, with the Lebanon Bible Church and Goshen Congregational Church located in the "Goshen" area of town.  At one time there was a synagogue located in the Goshen area until it closed due to declining attendance.  A town museum was recently constructed on the Green as well.  Signs set up upon entering the town read: "Lebanon, Connecticut Est. 1700 Preserving our History and our Agriculture".

Notable people

 William Beaumont (1785–1853), "Father of Gastric Physiology" whose book describing digestion, published in 1833, became a classical medical study still used today
 Martha Wadsworth Brewster (1710 – ), poet and writer, one of the earliest American female literary figures
 William Alfred Buckingham (1804–1875), businessman, elected four-term mayor of Norwich, later elected seven-term governor of Connecticut. Served during the Civil War. Elected to the U.S. Senate in 1868 and died in office.
 Nelson Dewey (1813–1889), first governor of Wisconsin (1848–1852) at the age of 35
 Ralph Gurley (1797–1872), clergyman, chaplain of the US House of Representatives, and an influential figure in the American Colonization Society, which offered passage to their colony in west Africa (now Liberia) to free black Americans
 Prince Saunders (1775–1839), attorney general of the Republic of Haiti
 William Strong (Vermont politician) (1763–1840), US congressman and judge
 Jonathan Trumbull Sr. (1710–1785), governor of Connecticut, father of Jonathan Trumbull Jr., and a strong supporter of Washington during the American Revolutionary War, studied theology in Lebanon and later died in the town, where he is buried (portrait at right)
 Joseph Trumbull (1737–1778), a delegate to the Continental Congress in 1774 (did not attend sessions), and colonel in the Continental Army. He served as one of the Commissary Generals. Son of Jonathan Trumbull Sr.
 Jonathan Trumbull Jr. (1740–1809), General George Washington's secretary during the American Revolution, later eight-term governor of the state. Son of Jonathan Trumbull Sr.
 John Trumbull (1756–1843), American neoclassical painter, famous for artwork in the US Capitol, and the artwork on the back of the two-dollar bill. Son of Jonathan Trumbull Sr.
 Joseph Trumbull (1782–1861), state governor, later Connecticut representative to the US Congress. Grandson of Jonathan Trumbull Sr.
 Pelatiah Webster (1726–1795), Colonial merchant and author of short essays concerning the finances and government of the fledging United States
 William Williams (1731–1811), merchant and delegate for Connecticut to the Second Continental Congress in 1776, where he signed the Declaration of Independence. Son-in-law of Jonathan Trumbull Sr.
 Eleazar Wheelock (1711–1779), Congregational minister, orator, educator, and founder of Dartmouth College

Geography

Principal communities
Exeter
Goshen Hill
Lebanon Center
Leonard Bridge
Liberty Hill

Other minor named locations in the town are Babcock Hill, Bush Hill, Chestnut Hill, Cook Hill, Coreyville, Kick Hill, Mason Hill, Scott Hill, Standish Hill, and Village Hill.

Demographics

As of the census of 2000, there were 6,907 people, 2,446 households, and 1,934 families residing in the town. The racial makeup of the town was 96.89% White, 0.81% African American, 0.39% Native American, 0.26% Asian, 0.06% Pacific Islander, 0.49% from other races, and 1.10% from two or more races. Hispanic or Latino of any race were 1.65% of the population.

There were 2,446 households, out of which 38.6% had children under the age of 18 living with them, 66.4% were married couples living together, 8.8% had a female householder with no husband present, and 20.9% were non-families. 15.7% of all households were made up of individuals, and 5.4% had someone living alone who was 65 years of age or older.  The average household size was 2.77 and the average family size was 3.09.

In the town, the population was spread out, with 28.0% under the age of 18, 5.5% from 18 to 24, 31.0% from 25 to 44, 26.0% from 45 to 64, and 9.5% who were 65 years of age or older.  The median age was 38 years. For every 100 females, there were 101.9 males.  For every 100 females age 18 and over, there were 98.2 males.

The median income for a household in the town was $61,173, and the median income for a family was $63,198. Males had a median income of $45,952 versus $35,594 for females. The per capita income for the town was $25,784.  About 1.5% of families and 2.3% of the population were below the poverty line, including 2.0% of those under age 18 and 3.7% of those age 65 or over.

References

External links
Town of Lebanon official website
Town of Lebanon Official GIS Maps and Property Information
Jonathan Trumbull Library, town public library
Lebanon Historical Society

 
Towns in New London County, Connecticut
Towns in Connecticut
1700 establishments in Connecticut
Populated places established in 1700